Abdool Razack Mahomed Ameen Peeroo GOSK (born 16 April 1945) served as Speaker of the National Assembly of Mauritius from July 2012 until December 2014.

He was educated at King's College London and is a member of Lincoln's Inn. He previously served as Attorney-General and Minister of Labour, Human Rights and Corporate Affairs from 1995 to 2000.

References

1945 births
Living people
Mauritian politicians of Indian descent
Alumni of King's College London
Members of Lincoln's Inn
Speakers of the National Assembly (Mauritius)
Government ministers of Mauritius
20th-century Mauritian lawyers
Grand Officers of the Order of the Star and Key of the Indian Ocean
Labour Party (Mauritius) politicians
Mauritian Muslims
Attorneys general of Mauritius